Coutchman (sometimes spelled Couchman) is a ghost town in northern Freestone County, Texas, United States, some 4 miles southwest of Streetman off of Texas Farm to Market Road 246, near CR 994 and CR 995.

Coutchman was settled around 1850 and named after local landowner William Coutchman. It had a peak population of about 300 people. Coutchman had a post office from January 1894 to February 1905, at which time post was directed to the post office in Wortham. In the 1910 census Coutchman was listed as having a population of 100 people. By 1980 there was no listing. The area ceased to have an identity as a separate community later in the 20th century.

Coutchman is best known as the birthplace of blues great Blind Lemon Jefferson.

References
 Handbook of Texas Online article
 Post offices of Freestone County
 Hammond's Modern Atlas of the World, C. S. Hammond & Company, New York, 1917

Populated places in Freestone County, Texas
Ghost towns in East Texas